Tumachlar (also Romanized as Tūmāchlar; also known as Tūmīāchlar Khvājeh Nafas) is a village in Jafarbay-ye Gharbi Rural District, Gomishan District, Torkaman County, Golestan Province, Iran. At the 2006 census, its population was 457, in 89 families.

References 

Populated places in Torkaman County